Fàn Zhi ( 911 – 5 November 964), formally the Duke of Lu, was a civil official who served under 12 emperors of 6 dynasties during imperial China's Five Dynasties and Ten Kingdoms period and the subsequent Song Dynasty. He was the Later Zhou chancellor from 951 until 960, and the Song Dynasty chancellor from 960 until 964, not long before his death. A strict adherent to legal guidelines, he had influenced Later Zhou and Song rulers to rely more on civil administration in an age dominated by the military. Fàn was a member of the elite Fàn family.

Early life
Growing up, Fàn Zhi's father Fàn Shouyu (范守遇) was a staff supervisor serving the Later Liang. Biographer Jack Dull considers Fàn Zhi a representative of the rise of "new families" which were gradually replacing the exclusive aristocracy of the Tang Dynasty. At age eight, Fàn Zhi was able to write essays, and by 12 he already mastered and began teaching the voluminous classic Book of Documents.

Career under Later Tang
Later Liang was replaced by the Later Tang in 926, and Fàn passed the imperial examination in 933. The chief examination administrator He Ning reportedly liked Fàn's writing the most that he intentionally assigned Fàn 13th place, which was the placing he himself got back in the day. Fàn became a prefectural judge for the Zhongwu Commandery (忠武軍; roughly governing today's central Henan), and was later promoted to the post of subprefect of Fengqiu which he served until Later Tang was overthrown in 936.

Career under Later Jin
Under the new Later Jin, Fàn's essays caught the eyes of chancellor Sang Weihan, who helped Fàn become the imperial investigating censor, a lowly position at the censorial offices. When Sang was subsequently appointed to other prefectures and eventually back as the chancellor, Fàn followed him along the way. In 943, Fàn Zhi was promoted to the post of assistant division chief of the Department of Hospitality and auxiliary official of the Institute of History. A year later, he became a Hanlin Academician and division chief of the Department of Accounting, Ministry of Finance, as well as special drafting of the Secretariat.

Career under the Liao Dynasty

Career under Later Han

Career under Later Zhou
Guo Wei,  a Later Han general, had been impressed by the timeliness and the contents of the imperial orders he received while fighting rebellions away from the capital. Once he asked the messenger who wrote the orders. "Fàn Zhi" was the reply, and Guo remarked, "Definitely fit to be chancellor."

In the winter months of early 951, Guo Wei rebelled against the Later Han emperor Liu Chengyou and his army swiftly conquered the capital Kaifeng. Amidst the chaos after Liu's fleeing from the city, Guo remembered the name Fàn Zhi and asked for his whereabouts. When Fàn – who was living with other commoners – was located, Guo paid him a personal visit in heavy snow and during the conversation, removed his own robe to put on Fàn for warmth. As a token of his friendship to Guo, Fàn wrote several imperial orders for Guo, helping him to transition the state as Guo declared himself the emperor of the new Later Zhou Dynasty.

Career under Song
One day in 960, Fàn was dining in his own residence when general Zhao Kuangyin, who was supposed to be on the way to resist the Liao Dynasty invasion, stormed in. In tears, Zhao explained to Fàn that he was forced to become the emperor and return to the capital by his subordinates. Stunned and not sure what to suggest, Fàn was confronted by Zhao's attendant Luo Yangui, who raised his sword to threaten Fàn into accepting the usurpation. When Fàn realized that everything was nothing but acting, he came down the stairs and bowed to Zhao, who became the first emperor of the Song Dynasty.

Notes and references

Sources
 
  
  
  

Later Zhou chancellors
Later Han (Five Dynasties) politicians
Song dynasty chancellors
964 deaths
910s births
Later Tang politicians
Later Jin (Five Dynasties) politicians
Later Zhou historians
Chinese jurists
Song dynasty historians
Politicians from Xingtai
Historians from Hebei
10th-century Chinese historians
Song dynasty politicians from Hebei
Song dynasty essayists